Steve(n) or Stephen Hobbs may refer to:

 Steve Hobbs (Missouri politician), Republican member of the Missouri House of Representatives
 Steve Hobbs (Washington politician) (born 1970), Democratic member of the Washington State Senate
 Stephen Hobbs (born 1965), American football player
 Steven Hobbs (murderer) (born 1971), American murderer and suspected serial killer